Stepan Chapman (May 27, 1951 — January 27, 2014) was an American writer of speculative fiction and fabulation. He is best known for the Philip K. Dick Award winning novel The Troika.

Chapman was born and raised in Chicago and then studied theatre at the University of Michigan. His first published work was a story in Analog Science Fiction and Fact in 1969. As a rule his work is more fable-like in tone and surreal than is common for that magazine. He also had several stories in Damon Knight's Orbit anthologies. From the late 1970s, he was primarily published in small literary magazines. A collection of his stories was published, titled Dossier.

References

External links

1951 births
2014 deaths
20th-century American novelists
American male novelists
American science fiction writers
Writers from Chicago
Place of death missing
University of Michigan School of Music, Theatre & Dance alumni
American male short story writers
American fantasy writers
20th-century American short story writers
20th-century American male writers
Novelists from Illinois